María Luz Galicia (born 1940) is a former Spanish film actress.

Selected filmography
 Cabaret (1953)
 Good News (1954)
 Señora Ama (1955)
 El malvado Carabel (1956)
 Zorro the Avenger (1962)
 Shades of Zorro (1962)
 The Sign of the Coyote (1963)

References

Bibliography 
 Pitts, Michael R. Western Movies: A Guide to 5,105 Feature Films. McFarland, 2012.
 Thomas Weisser. Spaghetti Westerns--the Good, the Bad and the Violent: A Comprehensive, Illustrated Filmography of 558 Eurowesterns and Their Personnel, 1961–1977. McFarland, 2005.

External links 
 

1940 births
Living people
Spanish film actresses
People from Madrid